Sycamore Canyon is the second largest canyon in the Arizona redrock country, after Oak Creek Canyon. It is in North Central Arizona bordering and below the Mogollon Rim, and is located west and northwest of Sedona in Yavapai and Coconino counties.

Description
Sycamore Creek, a tributary of the Verde River, flows through the canyon.

Located within three different U.S. National Forests, the Coconino, Kaibab, and Prescott National Forests, Sycamore Canyon is home to a variety of wildlife including black bear, deer, and mountain lion. Hiking and horseback riding are the only ways to visit the canyon. The most popular access is via the Parsons Spring trail, upriver from Tuzigoot National Monument. A high-clearance vehicle is helpful to reach the trailhead.

Sycamore Canyon is one of the oldest designated Wilderness Areas in Arizona, originally being a Forest Service "Primitive Area" before the Wilderness Act of 1964.

Gallery

See also

 Keyhole Sink

Additional Reading
 Paradise Forks Rock Climbing by David Bloom

References

External links

 Coconino National Forest: Sycamore Canyon Wilderness
 Sycamore Canyon in Pajarito Wilderness, southern Arizona

Canyons and gorges of Arizona
Mogollon Rim
Landforms of Coconino County, Arizona
Wilderness areas of Arizona
Landforms of Yavapai County, Arizona
Kaibab National Forest
Coconino National Forest
Prescott National Forest